Bloodline Records was an American hip hop record label, founded by Earl "DMX" Simmons. Bloodline used to be distributed by Def Jam Recordings but is no more, as DMX left Def Jam for Sony BMG Records. Bloodline Records is now in search of a new distributor.

History
The label was previously distributed by Def Jam Recordings. Iceberg (now known as Hitmaka) left Bloodline in late 2001 at the request of his parents. Loose Cannon, who appeared on It's Dark & Hell Is Hot, got into a dispute with DMX when X re-used a verse he sold to Loose on "Where the Hood At?". Loose then left the label in early 2004.

In 2006, Kashmir (now known simply as Kash) left the label to pursue a solo career. Big Stan also left Bloodline sometime in 2006/2007 to pursue his own company, Live Young Die Rich Entertainment.

Artists

Current
 Word One

Former
 DMX 
Yung Berg
Loose Cannon
Kashmir
Big Stan
Bazaar Royale

See also
 List of record labels
 Ruff Ryders Entertainment

References

External links
Bloodline Records on Myspace

American record labels
Record labels established in 2000
Hip hop record labels
Hardcore hip hop record labels
DMX (rapper)
Defunct record labels of the United States